The Fremont Symphony Orchestra was established in Fremont, California as a community orchestra in 1964 and was first called the "Fremont Philharmonic" and later the "Fremont-Newark Philharmonic Society."

History
The Fremont Philharmonic Society was created in 1964 by Eugene Stoia, the orchestra’s first Music Director, who brought together a group of musicians and supporters of the arts to make their common dream of a local symphony orchestra a reality. The very first rehearsal was set for September, and the first concert was planned for that winter at Mission San Jose High School.

The musicians received no compensation at the time, and merely played for the love of music. And play they did, with verve, skill, and the determination to mold a new sound in the community. And the people of Fremont responded by attending the concerts and supporting this new orchestra they could call their own. In 1970 the name was changed to the Fremont-Newark Philharmonic to better reflect the orchestra's membership and audience base.

Following its modest beginnings, when musicians had to pay one dollar to join, the Philharmonic grew and matured impressively both in quality and in numbers. Music Director Eugene Stoia was succeeded by William Galbraith and Jason Klein, and the orchestra's sound also improved as a few professional musicians were hired to fill strategic positions.

David Sloss was chosen as Music Director in 1980, and by 1983 all musicians were paid and the caliber of musicians gradually upgraded to a fully professional organization. In 1994 the Philharmonic adopted the name "Fremont Symphony Orchestra," and performed exclusively at the Gary Soren Smith Center for the Fine and Performing Arts at Ohlone College for the next twenty seasons.

In 2012, Gregory Van Sudmeier succeeded David Sloss as Music Director. In 2014 Sudemeier announced his decision to move to across the country, but offered to continue conducting if needed. In January 2015, the Board of Directors announced the decision to launch a guest conductor series beginning with former Music Director Jason Klein, who conducted a romantic concert on Valentine's Day followed by Michael Morgan, Jung-ho Pak and Dawn Harms in subsequent concerts. In May 2016, the Fremont Symphony performed a special concert led by Michael Morgan and introducing three gifted young conductors—Matilda Hofman, Andrew Whitfield and Tyler Catlin. In the 2016-17 season, guest conductors include former Music Director David Sloss, Dawn Harms and John Farrer.

In 2014, Prince of Peace Lutheran Church was introduced as an alternate performance venue in addition to the Smith Center at Ohlone College.

The Fremont Symphony Orchestra is a nonprofit organization and member of the American Symphony Orchestra League (ASOL) and the Association of California Symphony Orchestras (ACSO).

Performances
The orchestra provides a subscription concert series featuring four or five performances of classical symphonic music each season, in addition to numerous educational performances and programs for children. The orchestra's Young Artist Competition has launched the careers of many young musicians who later rose to international stardom, most notably Aileen Chanco, Natasha Paremski and Chloe Pang. In 2005, the Fremont Symphony Orchestra performed Fremont's first full-length ballet production, Tchaikovsky's The Nutcracker, choreographed by the acclaimed Yoko Young. The orchestra currently performs at the Prince of Peace Lutheran Church and at the Gary Soren Smith Center for the Fine and Performing Arts of Ohlone College.

References
Fremont Symphony Orchestra

External links
Fremont Symphony Orchestra

Culture of Fremont, California
Musical groups from the San Francisco Bay Area
Musical groups established in 1964
Orchestras based in California